The Outsider is an American detective drama that aired on NBC for one season from September 18, 1968, until April 16, 1969.

Premise
David Ross was an ex-convict, who spent six years in prison for a murder he did not commit, then became a private investigator in Los Angeles. Though he received a governor's pardon, he is constantly harassed by police partly for his alleged past crime and partly because he is a private eye.  He only resorts to violence when forced to, and his carry pistol is a tiny .25-caliber automatic.  Many of his cases involve eccentric Hollywood or Southern California types, with whom he copes in a bemused fashion.

Episodes

One two-part program was edited together into a feature-length film and shown on U.S. television under the title The 24-hour Mile.  A paperback spinoff novel, The Outsider, was written by American thriller writer Jim Thompson.

References

External links

1960s American crime television series
NBC original programming
Television shows set in Los Angeles
1968 American television series debuts
1969 American television series endings
American detective television series
English-language television shows
Television series by Universal Television